Myristic acid (IUPAC name: tetradecanoic acid) is a common saturated fatty acid with the molecular formula . Its salts and esters are commonly referred to as myristates or tetradecanoates. It is named after the binomial name for nutmeg (Myristica fragrans), from which it was first isolated in 1841 by Lyon Playfair.

Occurrence

Nutmeg butter has 75% trimyristin, the triglyceride of myristic acid. Besides nutmeg, myristic acid is found in palm kernel oil, coconut oil, butterfat, 8–14% of bovine milk, and 8.6% of breast milk  as well as being a minor component of many other animal fats. It is found in spermaceti, the crystallized fraction of oil from the sperm whale. It is also found in the rhizomes of the Iris, including Orris root.

Chemical behaviour

Myristic acid acts as a lipid anchor in biomembranes.

Reduction of myristic acid yields myristyl aldehyde and myristyl alcohol.

Health effects

Myristic acid consumption raises low-density lipoprotein (LDL) cholesterol.

References

Fatty acids
Alkanoic acids